Stephen Robins (born 25 February 1957) is  a former Australian rules footballer who played with Essendon in the Victorian Football League (VFL).

Notes

External links 		
		
Stephen Robins's profile at Australianfootball.com		
		
		
		
		
Living people		
1957 births		
		
Australian rules footballers from Victoria (Australia)		
Essendon Football Club players